Jeal is a surname. Notable people with the surname include:

Tim Jeal (born 1945), British biographer and novelist
Wendy Jeal (born 1960), British track and field athlete

See also
Beal (surname)

English-language surnames